Eric Blum (born 13 June 1986) is a Swiss professional ice hockey player who is currently an unrestricted free agent. He last played as an alternate captain of SC Bern of the National League (NL).

Playing career
Blum joined Bern after four seasons with the Kloten Flyers, signing a three-year deal with an NHL/KHL out clause on May 2, 2014.

Blum competed in the 2013 IIHF World Championship as a member of the Switzerland men's national ice hockey team.

On September 26, 2016, Blum agreed to a 5-year contract extension with SC Bern worth CHF 3.5 million.

International play
Representing Switzerland internationally, he participated in four World Championships (winning a silver medal in 2013) and the 2018 Olympic Winter Games. He won a total of 89 caps (5 goals, 14 assists) for the Swiss men's national team, before announcing the end of his international career in April 2018.

Career statistics

Regular season and playoffs

International

Awards and honours

References

External links
 

1986 births
Living people
GCK Lions players
EHC Kloten players
Ice hockey players at the 2018 Winter Olympics
Olympic ice hockey players of Switzerland
SC Bern players
SCL Tigers players
Swiss ice hockey defencemen
Swiss people of Japanese descent
Sportspeople from the canton of Lucerne